Jakob Arduser (born 26 February 1939) is a Swiss alpine skier. He competed in the men's downhill at the 1960 Winter Olympics.

References

1939 births
Living people
Swiss male alpine skiers
Olympic alpine skiers of Switzerland
Alpine skiers at the 1960 Winter Olympics